Antoni Tàpies i Puig, 1st Marquess of Tápies (13 December 1923 – 6 February 2012) was a Catalan painter, sculptor and art theorist, who became one of the most famous European artists of his generation.

Life

The son of Josep Tàpies i Mestre and Maria Puig i Guerra, Antoni Tàpies Puig was born in Barcelona on 13 December 1923. His father was a lawyer and Catalan nationalist who served briefly with the Republican government. Due to this, Tàpies grew up in an environment where he was very much exposed to a cultural and social experiences of leaders in the Catalan public life and its republicanism.  His maternal grandmother also exposed him to this world with her great involvement in civil and political activities.  Tàpies was first introduced to contemporary art as he entered secondary school in 1934.  He saw a famous Christmas issue of the magazine, D’ací i d’allà, which contained reproductions of works by artists such as Duchamp, Braque, Kandinsky, and Picasso.  At 17, Tàpies suffered a near-fatal heart attack caused by tuberculosis. He spent two years as a convalescent in the mountains, reading widely and pursuing an interest in art that had already expressed itself when he was in his early teens.

Tàpies studied at the German School of Barcelona. After studying law for 3 years, he devoted himself from 1943 onwards only to his painting.  In 1945 Tàpies began experimenting with more rinse materials.  He would mix oil paint with whiting.  At this time he also became increasingly interested in philosophy, especially that of Sartre as well as Eastern thought.  He became known as one of Spain's most renowned artists in the second half of the 20th century. His abstract and avant-garde works were displayed in many major museums all over the world.  In 1954 Tàpies married Teresa Barba Fabregas.  Together they had three children Antoni, Miguel and Clara.
He lived mainly in Barcelona. Tàpies died on 6 February 2012; his health had been suffering since 2007.

Work

Tàpies was perhaps the best-known Spanish (Catalan) artist to emerge in the period since the Second World War. He first came into contact with contemporary art as a teenager through the magazine D’Ací i D’Allà, published in Barcelona, and during the Spanish Civil War (1936–39), while he was still at school, he taught himself to draw and paint. On a French government scholarship in the early 1950s he lived in Paris, to which he often returned. Both in Europe and beyond, the highly influential French critic and curator Michel Tapié enthusiastically promoted the work of Antoni Tàpies.

In 1948, Tàpies helped co-found the first Post-War Movement in Spain known as Dau al Set which was connected to the Surrealist and Dadaist Movements.  The main leader and founder of Dau al Set was the poet Joan Brossa.  The movement also had a publication of the same name, Dau al Set.  Tàpies started as a surrealist painter, his early works were influenced by Paul Klee and Joan Miró; but soon become an informal artist, working in a style known as pintura matèrica, in which non artistic materials are incorporated into the paintings. In 1953 he began working in mixed media; this is considered his most original contribution to art. One of the first to create serious art in this way, he added clay and marble dust to his paint and used waste paper, string, and rags (Grey and Green Painting, Tate Gallery, London, 1957).  Canvas Burned to Matter from c. 1960, in the collection of the Honolulu Museum of Art, is an example of the artist's mixed media assemblages that combine the principles of Dada and Surrealism.

Tàpies' international reputation was well established by the end of the 1950s. From the late 1950s to early 1960s, Tàpies worked with Enrique Tábara, Antonio Saura, Manolo Millares and many other Spanish Informalist artists. In 1966 he was arrested at a clandestine assembly at the University of Barcelona; his work of the early 1970s is marked by symbols of Catalan identity (which was anathema to Franco). In 1974 he made a series of lithographs called Assassins and displayed them in the Galerie Maeght in Paris, in honour of regime critic Salvador Puig Antich's memory. From about 1970 (influenced by Pop art) he began incorporating more substantial objects into his paintings, such as parts of furniture. Tàpies's ideas have had worldwide influence on art, especially in the realms of painting, sculpture, etchings and lithography. Examples of his work are found in numerous major international collections. His work is associated with both Tachisme and Abstract Expressionism.

The paintings produced by Tàpies, later in the 1970s and in the 1980s, reveal his application of this aesthetic of meditative emptiness, for example in spray-painted canvases with linear elements suggestive of Oriental calligraphy, in mixed-media paintings that extended the vocabulary of Art informel, and in his oblique allusions to imagery within a fundamentally abstract idiom, as in Imprint of a Basket on Cloth (1980). Among the artists' work linked in style to that of Tàpies is that of the American painter Julian Schnabel as both have been connected to the art term "Matter".

Graphic work
From 1947 Tàpies also produced graphic work. He produced collector’s books and dossiers in association with poets and writers such as Alberti, Bonnefoy, Du Bouchet, Brodsky, Brossa, Daive, Dupin, Foix, Frémon, Gimferrer, Guillén, Jabès, Mestres Quadreny, Mitscherlich, Paz, Saramago, Takiguchi, Ullán, Valente and Zambrano.

Essays
Tàpies has written essays which have been collected in a series of publications, some translated into different languages: La pràctica de l’art (1970), L’art contra l’estètica, (1974), Memòria personal (1978), La realitat com a art (1982), Per un art modern i progressista (1985), Valor de l’art (1993) and L’art i els seus llocs (1999).  These works include Tàpies reflecting on things such as art, life, and politics.  He also discusses the social role of art and the artist, reflects on the influences of his work, and explains his artistic as well as political views.

Movements
Throughout the span of his life Antoni Tàpies has been associated with a number movements such as Art Informel and Haute Pâte or Matter Painting.  He became a part of the avant-garde group Dau al Set in 1948 which was a group that had strong ties to Surrealism.  Early works of his were surrealistic, but in 1953 he began working in abstract art.  It is here that he becomes a part of the Art Informel movement and starts working with mixed media. Art Informel in Europe was the equivalent to Abstract Expressionism in America.  This was among the most prevalent styles of art in post-war Europe.  Within this movement is the category of Matter Painting.  Its focus on the use of odd objects completely undermines the acts of traditional fine art.  Some of Tàpies's most famous and original works fall within this genre.  They are characterized by his use of marble dust and clay that he mixed with his paints as well as the incorporation of found objects such as string, paper, and cloth.  In the late 1960s into the early 1970s Tàpies began to be influenced by the movement of Pop Art.  Because of this he began using larger items, such as pieces of furniture, in his works.

Exhibitions

 In 1950, Tàpies' first solo show was held at the Galeries Laietanes, Barcelona, and he was included in the Carnegie International in Pittsburgh. 
 In 1953 he had his first shows in the United States, at the Marshall Field Art Gallery in Chicago and the Martha Jackson Gallery in New York. 
 In 1962 he was given the opportunity to have a Guggenheim Retrospective.
 Some of his other retrospectives were presented at the Musée National d'Art Moderne, Paris, in 1973 and at the Albright-Knox Art Gallery, Buffalo, New York, in 1977. 
 Later he was the subject of retrospective exhibitions at the Jeu de Paume in Paris in 1994. 
 Kestnergesellschaft in Hannover in 1998. 
 In New York, 2000, he had an exhibition at the Pace Wildenstein which consisted of multimedia paintings as well as small bronzes and assemblages.
 The Museo Nacional Centro de Arte Reina Sofía in Madrid in 2000, and was exhibited at the Anita Shapolsky Gallery in New York City in 2006, 2012, and 2014.
 In 2007 at the age of 83, Tàpies had an exhibition at Pace Wildenstein where he showed 17 paintings done on wood as well as canvas.
In 2017, Nahmad Contemporary in New York presented the exhibition Tàpies: Paintings, 1970–2003.
 'Antoni Tàpies. Objects'. Until February, 2018 at Fundació Antoni Tàpies museum, Barcelona

Legacy
The Antoni Tàpies Foundation or Fundació Antoni Tàpies is a museum and cultural center located in Carrer d'Aragó, in Barcelona, Catalonia that is dedicated to the works and life of Antoni Tàpies.  It was established in 1984 by Tàpies himself.  His intent was to create a forum that would promote the study as well as the knowledge of modern and contemporary art.  It includes the temporary exhibitions, film seasons, lectures, symposiums, as well as different activities and showings of Tàpies's work.  The foundation owns one of the most extensive collections of Tàpies's work, mostly donated by Tàpies himself.  It also contains a large library that is dedicated solely to the artists of our century and the modern literature and documentation pertaining to the genre.

Recognition
 Tàpies was awarded in 1958 the First Prize for painting at the Pittsburgh International, and the UNESCO and David E. Bright Prizes at the Venice Biennale. 
 In 1958 Tàpies, along with Eduardo Chillida, represented Spain in the Venice Biennale.
 He received the Rubens Prize of Siegen, Germany, in 1972. 
 In the Academic Sphere, he received an Honorary Doctorate from the Rovira i Virgili University in 1994. 
 In 2003 Tàpies won Spain's most prestigious art award, the Velázquez prize. 
 On 9 April 2010, he was raised into the Spanish nobility by King Juan Carlos I with the hereditary title of Marqués de Tápies (Marquess of Tàpies) (English: Marquess of Tàpies). 
 Furthermore, he designed Rovira i Virgili University’s logo, which is characterized by the letter "a", symbol of universal’s knowledge principle.

Gallery of works

See also
 Rinzen, work by Tàpies conserved at MACBA in Barcelona

Notes

References
 Antoni Tàpies and Michel Tapié. Antonio Tapies [sic], New York, G. Wittenborn, 1959. 
 Solomon R. Guggenheim Museum. Antoni Tàpies New York [©1962] 
Mor Antoni Tàpies
La premsa internacional destaca la mort "d'un dels grans artistes europeus"
Antoni Tàpies art in Barcelona

External links

Fundació Antoni Tapies museum, Barcelona
Exhibition: Tàpies. An artist's collection, Barcelona 2015
Obituary in The Independent by Marcus Williamson
The UNESCO Works of Art Collection
Artcyclopedia on Antoni Tàpies
Britannica article

|-

1923 births
2012 deaths
Abstract painters
Art Informel and Tachisme painters
Painters from Catalonia
Sculptors from Catalonia
20th-century Spanish painters
20th-century Spanish male artists
Spanish male painters
21st-century Spanish painters
Spanish male sculptors
Dau al Set
Modern painters
Painters from Barcelona
Wolf Prize in Arts laureates
Recipients of the Praemium Imperiale
Marquesses of Spain
20th-century sculptors
Spanish contemporary artists
Honorary Members of the Royal Academy
21st-century Spanish male artists